Hakka opera or Han opera is a variety of Chinese opera from eastern Guangdong province, China. It enjoys a good popularity among Hakka people in Guangdong province.

References

Chinese opera
Hakka culture